Roberto Maytín (born 2 January 1989, in Carabobo) is a Venezuelan tennis player. He played for the Venezuelan Davis Cup squad in 2012. In 2015 he broke into the top 100 doubles rankings reaching a high of 86 in the world.

He is known mostly for doubles and has 14 ATP Challenger titles. He made his ATP debut in 2015 playing doubles with Colombian Juan Carlos Spir at the Ecuador Open in Quito. Currently his coaches are Jose De Armas and Cesar Wicha. In singles reach a career high of 643.

In March 2021, Maytín has been banned from the sport for 14 years after admitting multiple breaches of the Tennis Anti-Corruption Program (TACP) rules from International Tennis Integrity Agency. In addition to the ban, Maytín was fined $100,000, of which $75,000 is suspended.

ATP career finals

Doubles: 1 (1 runner-up)

Challenger and Futures finals

Singles: 3 (0–3)

Doubles: 54 (32–22)

References

Sources
 
 

Venezuelan male tennis players
Living people
1989 births
People from Carabobo
Central American and Caribbean Games bronze medalists for Venezuela
South American Games gold medalists for Venezuela
South American Games medalists in tennis
Competitors at the 2018 South American Games
Competitors at the 2014 Central American and Caribbean Games
Central American and Caribbean Games medalists in tennis
20th-century Venezuelan people
21st-century Venezuelan people
Baylor Bears men's tennis players